Loimaan kunta (literally "Municipality of Loimaa") is a former municipality of Finland. It was merged to the town of Loimaa in the beginning of 2005.

It was located in the province of Western Finland and was part of the Southwest Finland region. The municipality had a population of 5,909 (2003) and covered an area of 434.08 km² of which 1.52 km² was water. The population density was 13.6 inhabitants per km².

The municipality was unilingually Finnish.

Populated places disestablished in 2005
Former municipalities of Finland
Loimaa
2005 disestablishments in Finland